Ramashreya Jha (11 August 1928 – 1 January 2009) was a distinguished composer, musician, scholar and teacher of Hindustani Classical music. He was the Head of the Department of Music in Allahabad University from 1980 to 1989. He was known for his deep knowledge, creative genius and his gifts as a teacher.  His five-volume anthology Abhinava Geetanjali ranks high among the most influential works in Hindustani music. It contains critical analysis of ragas supplemented by numerous traditional and self-conceived compositions.

He is popularly known to musicians, students and music lovers around India by his nom de plume ‘Ramrang.' His name is also spelled Ram Ashray Jha.

Achievements
Among the first to notice Jha-sahab's magnificent compositions and parlay them was the famous maestro, the late Jitendra Abhisheki, who sang and taught Ramrang's many compositions.

In 1968, he was appointed to the faculty of Allahabad University and later in 1980 promoted to the position of Head of the Music Department. This move by the University was in recognition of genuine merit because Ramrang held no formal college degrees. He retired from his active professorial duties in 1989.

In 2005, Ramrang received the Sangeet Natak Akademi Award from Sangeet Natak Akademi, India's National Academy for Music, Dance and Drama. Ramrang died 1 January 2009, in Kolkata, India, due to complications following heart surgery.

Among his well-known disciples are Vidushi Kamla Bose, Shubha Mudgal and Late Dr.Geeta Banerjee.

References

External links
Ramrang – A Life in Music
Mehfil-e-Ramrang, a photo album
Ramrang – A Bouquet of Compositions
A Stroll in Ramrang's Garden
Ramashreya Jha
Life of Ramashreya Jha in Maithili

1928 births
2009 deaths
Hindustani singers
Musicians from Bihar
Academic staff of the University of Allahabad
Indian music educators
Indian musicologists
Recipients of the Sangeet Natak Akademi Award
Indian classical composers
Hindustani composers
20th-century Indian singers
Indian male composers
20th-century musicologists
20th-century Indian male singers